Wood Creek flows into the Mohawk River in West Schuyler, New York.

References 

Rivers of Oneida County, New York
Rivers of Herkimer County, New York
Mohawk River
Rivers of New York (state)